Xyropteris is a genus of ferns in the family Lindsaeaceae. It has a single described species, Xyropteris stortii, native to Sumatra and Borneo. Some sources do not recognize the genus Xyropteris, placing the species in Lindsaea as Lindsaea stortii.

References

Lindsaeaceae
Monotypic fern genera